Shaquille Lawson (born June 17, 1994) is an American football defensive end who is a free agent. He played college football at Clemson, and was drafted by the Buffalo Bills in the first round of the 2016 NFL Draft. Lawson has  been on the Miami Dolphins, Houston Texans and was traded to the New York Jets during the 2021 season. Lawson was released by the Jets prior to their season finale and returned to the Bills the following offseason.

Early years
Shaquille Olajuwan Lawson, named after the basketball players Shaquille O'Neal, and Hakeem Olajuwon, attended D. W. Daniel High School in Central, South Carolina. He had 99 tackles and nine sacks as a senior and 100 tackles and 13 sacks as a junior. Lawson was rated by Rivals.com as a four-star recruit and committed to Clemson University to play college football. After high school, Lawson attended Hargrave Military Academy for a year.

College career
In his first year at Clemson in 2013, Lawson played in all 13 games and had 35 tackles and four sacks. The four sacks tied William Perry and Ricky Sapp for most by a first-year freshman in Clemson history at the time. This record was broken in the 2016 season by Dexter Lawrence. He again played in all 13 games as a sophomore in 2014 and made one start. For the season he had 44 tackles and 3.5 sacks. Lawson became a starter his junior year in 2015.

College statistics

Professional career

Buffalo Bills
The Buffalo Bills selected Lawson in the first round with the 19th overall pick in the 2016 NFL Draft.

2016–17
On May 17, 2016, Lawson underwent shoulder surgery after tweaking it during offseason drills and was ruled out 4 to 6 months.

On June 6, 2016, the Buffalo Bills signed Lawson to a four-year, $10.27 million contract that includes $9.82 million guaranteed and a signing bonus of $5.67 million.

On August 30, 2016, Lawson was placed on the Reserve/PUP list. He was activated to the active roster on October 21, 2016. Lawson recorded his first NFL sack against the New England Patriots in Week 8.

In 2017, Lawson started 10 out of 11 games played, recording 33 tackles and four sacks. He suffered an ankle injury in Week 13 and was placed on injured reserve on December 5, 2017.

2018
Lawson started the 2018 season as the backup to free-agent signing Trent Murphy, but still retained significant playing time as the Bills rotated their defensive personnel throughout games. Lawson started several games after Murphy struggled with injuries. He recorded seven tackles in a Week 9 loss to the Chicago Bears. Against the Jacksonville Jaguars in Week 12, Lawson was involved in a fistfight with Jaguars running back Leonard Fournette as part of a brawl that broke out between the two teams in the third quarter. Lawson and Fournette were both ejected from the game for the scuffle, but while Lawson only received a $33,425 fine, Fournette was suspended for one game. Lawson later stated he was defending himself and his teammates and that Fournette initiated the fight.

Against the Miami Dolphins in Week 17, Lawson collected two sacks on Ryan Tannehill in addition to a forced fumble, making this his first career multi-sack game. He finished the 2018 season with much-improved stats, recording 30 combined tackles, four sacks, two fumbles forced, and six passes defended on the year. He was also named by Pro Football Focus to their team of the week after a strong performance against the Detroit Lions in week 15.

2019
On May 1, 2019, the Bills declined the fifth-year option on Lawson's contract, making him a free agent in 2020. Against the Denver Broncos in week 12, Lawson recorded two sacks on quarterback Brandon Allen after Broncos lineman Connor McGovern told Lawson he'd "never heard of him". Lawson finished the season with a career-high 6.5 sacks.

Miami Dolphins
On March 21, 2020, Lawson signed a three-year, $30 million contract with the Miami Dolphins. He was placed on the reserve/COVID-19 list by the team on August 6, 2020, and activated the next day.

In Week 4 against the Seattle Seahawks, Lawson recorded his first sack as a Dolphin on Russell Wilson during the 31–23 loss. In Week 9, against the Arizona Cardinals, Lawson recovered a fumble forced by teammate Emmanuel Ogbah on Kyler Murray and returned it for a 36-yard touchdown during the 34–31 victory.

Houston Texans
On March 17, 2021, Lawson and a 2021 sixth-round pick were traded to the Houston Texans in exchange for Benardrick McKinney and a 2021 seventh-round pick.

New York Jets
On August 29, 2021, the New York Jets traded a 2022 sixth-round pick to the Texans in exchange for Lawson. He was released on January 8, 2022, right before the season finale. He finished the season with 23 tackles and one sack through 14 games and seven starts.

Buffalo Bills (second stint)
On March 18, 2022, Lawson signed with the Buffalo Bills on a one-year deal. Lawson had publicly spoken about wanting to return to Buffalo since his release from the Jets. During end of season interviews on January 23, 2023, Lawson said one of his former teams had told him, "Be seen and not heard", and said that coming back to Buffalo had helped get his mental state out of a dark place. During the 2022-23 season, Lawson played in 15 games, recording 31 combined tackles, 3.5 sacks, and a forced fumble.

NFL career statistics

Regular season

Postseason

Personal life
Lawson's father was killed in a car accident during his junior year of high school. Lawson then chose to attend Clemson University to remain close to his family.

References

External links
Miami Dolphins bio
Clemson Tigers bio

1994 births
Living people
People from Central, South Carolina
Players of American football from South Carolina
American football defensive ends
Clemson Tigers football players
All-American college football players
Buffalo Bills players
Miami Dolphins players
Houston Texans players
New York Jets players
Hargrave Military Academy alumni